Tom, Tom, the Piper's Son is a 1969 American experimental film made by Ken Jacobs.

Summary

In a meticulous experiment in rephotography, Jacobs deconstructs, manipulates, and recontextualizes a small fragment of found footage: a 1905 film showing a group of people chasing a thief through a barn, (shot and directed by G.W. ‘Billy’ Bitzer), rescued via a paper print filed for copyright purposes with the Library of Congress," according to Jacobs. Jacobs' refashioning of the footage is an essayistic meditation on the nature of cinematic representation; in the words of Chicago Reader critic Fred Camper, it is "a film about watching movies."

Legacy
The film is considered a landmark in avant-garde and structural filmmaking, and remains Jacobs' best-known work. It was inducted to the National Film Registry in 2007, and is part of Anthology Film Archives' "Essential Cinema" repertory.

See also
 List of American films of 1969
 1905 in film
 Metafilm

References

External links
 Tom, Tom, the Piper's Son at the Film-Makers' Cooperative

 - 1969 film
 - 1905 film

Jacobs discussing the work in 1969 at St. John's University
Optic Antics, the first major academic survey of Jacobs' work, including Tom, Tom, the Piper's Son

1969 films
1960s avant-garde and experimental films
American silent films
Collage film
Films directed by Ken Jacobs
United States National Film Registry films
1960s American films